Jumilla is a town and a municipality in southeastern Spain. It is located in the north east of the Region of Murcia, close to the towns of Cieza and Yecla. According to the 2018 census, the town population was 25,547.

Geography 
It shares borders with the municipality of Yecla at its northeast and its east; with Abarán, Fortuna and Cieza at its south and with Abanilla at its east. It also adjoins the province of Albacete in the autonomous community Castilla–La Mancha at its west and the province of Alicante in the autonomous community Valencian Community.

In this municipality there are several mountain landforms. There are three which are specially noteworthy in the territory and these are Sierra del Carche, Sierra del Buey and Sierra de la Pila. Other geographical elements that occupy the territory are three salt evaporation ponds. Regarding water landforms, there are not any basin with permanent water flow, but there are three ramblas or arroyos (creeks).

Human geography 
The inhabitants of the municipality are distributed in the following localities: Jumilla, where 24,416 people live; La Estacada, where there are 284 residents; Fuente del Pino, which is located in the northern half and is home to 125 people; Cañada del Trigo, which is located in the southeast of Jumilla and has a population of 121; Torre del Rico, which is placed in the southeast of the municipality and is occupied by 106 residents; El Carche, which is placed in the east of the territory and occupied by 8 residents; La Alquería, with a population of 155 and Las Encebras, which is located in the southern half and is home to 45 people.

History 
This current municipality was populated in the Lower Paleolithic, 450,000 years ago. Remains of human presence in the Upper and Middle Paleolithic were discovered in the same spot as the Lower Paleolithic ones. These have a date of the 80,000 BC.

There is also evidence of human presence in the Epipaleolithic in this territory, and it consists in the archaeological sites.

Regarding the Chalcolithic in this current municipality, ruins of an ancient hamlet are the trace of the people living in that era. This hamlet was inhabited by 300 people, and its dwellings consisted of huts formed with reed and mud adobe.

There is a cave in this current municipality which had a sacred purpose for these people 5,000 years ago. In that spot, burial sites had been discovered.

The Bronze Age (1900 BC - 900 BC in Region of Murcia) was an important period for Jumilla and this statement is based in the fact that a relevant quantity of hamlets of this era were found with some archaeological operations.

In the 3rd century BC, the Carthaginians colonised a large part of the Iberian Peninsula: from the current city of Cádiz, to the Ebro River. The Roman Republic waged war on Carthage in the Second Punic War, and won.

As a result of these facts, Jumilla became Roman territory, and its farming lands were divided up among legionnaires. Remains of Ancient Rome in Jumilla are the Roman villa's ruins, which are part of the landscape of the municipality. Some remarkable remains are a bronze statuette of the god Hypos and mosaics.

There is a trace element from the 5th century AD (Late antiquity) and it consists in a funerary structure.

In the year 711 AD, Berbers and Arabs entered the Iberian Peninsula and conquered a large portion of it. Approximately the area of the current Region of Murcia came to be under Adb's Al-Aziz power. The Abd's Al-Aziz troops circulated through Jumilla territory. The Muslims used previous built fortifications for erecting their fortress.

In the mid-13th century, the king of the Taifa of Murcia Aben Hud was menaced by the Castillian troops and by the monarch of the Emirate of Granada, Aben Almahar. The king of the Taifa of Murcia reached an agreement with the prince Alfonso X of Castile, who would be king. In this deal, issues such as respecting the inhabitants lives and possessions were agreed.

Alfonso X of Castile visited Jumilla when he was king. He decided to get the Church of Santa María de Gracia built, and nowadays, a part of the church is still preserved.

After the death of Alfonso X, there were disputes for reigning. The Crown of Aragon took advantage of that situation - It broke out a war against the Crown of Castile and invaded the Kingdom of Murcia. Jumilla was conquered in the late 13th century or in the early 14th century. It was during under the Crown of Aragon Control era when the first historic document which address solely Jumilla was written. The document was about demarcating lands and municipality with boundary markers.

In the mid-14th century, when Jumilla was under the Crown of Aragon power, this town became a border locality. As a consequence, Jumilla must have been ruled with a man having an iron fist. Consequently, the inhabitants asked the king Peter of Castile for help in order to live in territory which belonged again to the Crown of Castile. Frederik of Castile, who was son of the king Ferdinand III of Castile, caused Jumilla to belong to the Crown of Castile again in the year 1357.

Two of the first important facts in Jumilla were the French invasion and the resulting Peninsular War. Jumilla plunged into the war and its inhabitants established the military defence junta.

Economy
Jumilla's economy is based on agriculture with main cultivation being vineyards, olive trees and fruit trees.

Jumilla is home to a large photovoltaic solar power farm, with an installed peak power capacity of 20 megawatts. The farm's total annual production will be the equivalent of the energy used by 20,000 homes. The solar panels are owned by groups of investors. It is expected to generate an estimated annual income of $28 million (€19 million) and a reduction in CO2 emissions of 42,000 tons a year. Powerlight provided single-axis solar trackers to improve the system's performance.

Jumilla, together with neighboring Yecla, is one of the primary regions for development of the Murciana and Granadina breeds of dairy goats. Jumilla is also a wine-producing region famous for its Carta Roja wines. Jumilla's wine production and culture are particularly notable for its use of the Monastrell grape as a varietal.

Main sights 
Some buildings that have special culture values such as historic or artistic are shown below:

El Casón: This is a funerary vault which estimated date of its building is the 5th century AD.
Jumilla's castle: The hill where the castle is built was inhabited by people from the Bronze Age. In a later era, this was occupied by people when Iberian civilizations were present in large part of Iberian Peninsula, and specifically in the current municipality. In Roman Iberian Peninsula period, people also leveraged this hill. The last era in regards to this hill before the construction of the current castle is the one when large part of Iberian Peninsula was under Muslim peoples rule. They built a fortress in the 8th century, but they used unstable materials. The current castle was built in the year 1461 and its architectural style is gothic.
Cuco de la Alberquilla/ Cuco de Zacarías
Santa María del Rosario Church: It was built on a Muslim cemetery in the first half of the 15th century, and it is placed in the town end.
Palacio del Antiguo Concejo
San Agustín Church: It is placed in the town end, and locals conceive it as a border demarcator in regards to the town and the countryside. It was erected in the year 1570 and restored in the late-18th century. It has a rectangular plan, one nave, some side chapels, and a small crossing. Two domes are present in the building – one roofs the crossing and the other roofs the altar.
Santa Ana del Monte Convent: This was built in the year 1573.
San Roque Arch
San José Church: This was built in the late 17th century. Its architectural style is baroque with local features of Region of Murcia.
San Antón Church: This was formed in 1611 and is placed in the town end. It has a Greek cross plan. The building was restored in 2002. Currently, it serves as a museum for Holy Week issues.
Vico Theatre: This building was constructed in the late 19th century and its architectural style is eclectic.
Modernist building: It was built in the year 1911.

Festivities 
The festivities held in the municipality are shown below:

 Holy Week
Wine grapes harvesting festivity: this event takes place in August, and it coincides with the patron saint festivity.
Patron saint festivity: It is held in August. It usually starts on the second week and lasts 10 or 11 days.
 Moros y cristianos: it also occurs in August.
 Jumilla Town National Festival of Folklore

See also
Torta de gazpacho
Spanish wine

References

Municipalities in the Region of Murcia